Murexsul interserratus is a species of sea snail, a marine gastropod mollusk in the family Muricidae, the murex snails or rock snails.

Description

Distribution

References

 Sowerby, G.B. II, 1879 – Murex. In: Thesaurus conchyliorum or genera of shells, vol. 4, p. 55 p, 24 pls
 Houart, R., 1982 – 3 tiny but confusing Muricids- Hawaiian Shell News, vol. 30(6), p. 1
 D'Attilio, A. & Myers, B., 1985 – Redescription of Murex interserratus G. B. Sowerby II, 1879- The Festivus, vol. 17(2), pp. 17–22

Muricidae
Gastropods described in 1879